James Douglas Johnson (August 20, 1924 – February 13, 2010), known as "Justice Jim" Johnson, was an Arkansas legislator and jurist known for outspoken support of racial segregation during the mid-20th century. He served as an associate justice of the Arkansas Supreme Court from 1959 to 1966, and in the Arkansas Senate from 1951 to 1957. Johnson unsuccessfully sought several elected positions, including Governor of Arkansas in 1956 and 1966, and the United States Senate in 1968. A segregationist, Johnson was frequently compared to George Wallace of Alabama. He joined the Republican Party in 1983.

Early life and career
Johnson was a native of Crossett in southern Arkansas near the Louisiana state line. He was the son of T. W. and Myrtle  Johnson, who owned and operated a grocery store in the sawmill town. During World War II, Johnson was drafted into the United States Marine Corps, serving in the Pacific Theater. After the war, Johnson attended Cumberland University, married Conway-native Virginia Lillian Morris, and returned to Crossett to start a law practice. She would serve as his legal secretary for the rest of her life.

Johnson was said to have admired the political style of Huey Long, but was to Long's political right. His interest in politics grew following the 1948 Democratic National Convention and formation of the Dixiecrat party. When former Governor of Arkansas Benjamin T. Laney recommended Johnson run for office, he sought the District 27 seat in the Arkansas Senate, which covered Ashley and Chicot counties. He was seated in the 58th Arkansas General Assembly.

Following the United States Supreme Court Brown v. Board of Education decision in 1954, Johnson sought to use segregation as a wedge issue for many campaigns thereafter. He brought the Citizens' Councils to Arkansas to stoke the white backlash created in the wake of Brown v. Board, and seized on the pending integration of Hoxie School District as a hot-button issue ahead of the 1956 gubernatorial election. Johnson also drafted and flogged an interposition amendment to the Arkansas Constitution and used red-baiting to raise the temperature around integration in Hoxie and raise his public profile.

In 1956, Johnson declined to run for another term in the legislature, instead seeking to challenge incumbent Governor Orval Faubus in the Democratic primary during the Solid South period, in which winning the Democratic primary was tantamount to election. Johnson accused the segregationist Faubus of working behind the scenes for racial integration, but finished a distant second with 83,856 votes (26.9%) Faubus went on to handily defeat Republican Roy Mitchell in the 1956 gubernatorial election for a second two-year term as governor.

Being a staunch and lifelong segregationist,  in 1955, in response to school integration occurring in Hoxie, Johnson proposed an amendment to the Arkansas constitution that would prohibit integration. Johnson also played a role in the Little Rock Nine crisis. He claimed to have hoaxed Governor Faubus into calling out the National Guard, supposedly to prevent a white mob from stopping the integration of Little Rock Central High School: "There wasn't any caravan. But we made Orval believe it. We said. 'They're lining up. They're coming in droves.' ... The only weapon we had was to leave the impression that the sky was going to fall." He later claimed that Faubus asked him to raise a mob to justify his actions. He was elected to the Arkansas Supreme Court in 1958 and served until 1966, when he resigned to run again for governor.

Campaigns of 1966 and 1968

In 1966, Johnson entered the Democratic gubernatorial primary and led the six-candidate field with 105,607 votes (25.1%). He went into a runoff election with fellow former justice Frank Holt (1911–1983), who polled 92,711 votes (22.1%). liberal former U.S. Representative Brooks Hays of Little Rock, finished third with 64,814 (15.4%). Another former U.S. representative, Dale Alford, who had unseated Hays as a write-in candidate in 1958, ran fourth with 53,531 votes (12.7%). Prosecuting attorney Sam Boyce of Newport ran fifth with 49,744 (11.8%), and Raymond Rebasmen finished last with 35,607 votes (8.5%). In the runoff primary, Johnson prevailed with 210,543 ballots (51.9%) to Holt's 195,442 votes (48.1%).

However, Johnson then lost the general election, 257,203 votes (45.6 percent) to the moderate Republican Winthrop Rockefeller, who polled 306,324 ballots (54.4%). Rockefeller was a younger brother of Nelson A. Rockefeller, who was then the Governor of New York and later Vice President of the United States under Gerald Ford. Jim Johnson won majorities in forty counties to Rockefeller's thirty-five counties. Every major population center, however, supported Winthrop Rockefeller, who prevailed in the northwestern counties, in Little Rock, and in many eastern counties with large African-American populations. Black voters provided Rockefeller's margin of victory. With this historic loss, Johnson became the first Southern Democrat since Reconstruction to be defeated by a Republican.

Johnson then ran against incumbent J. William Fulbright in the 1968 Democratic primary for the U.S. Senate but was again defeated, 132,038 (31.7%) to 220,684 (52.5%); a third candidate, Bobby K. Hayes, received the remaining 12.7%. Fulbright then defeated the Republican nominee, Charles T. Bernard, a farmer and businessman from Earle in Crittenden County in eastern Arkansas, who is believed  to have drawn considerable support from Johnson's former primary voters.

Johnson's then 40-year-old wife, Virginia, meanwhile, ran for the governorship in the same Democratic primary election, making her the first woman in Arkansas to run for governor. She lost the primary by a wide margin in a runoff with State Representative Marion H. Crank of rural Foreman in Little River County, who was in turn was narrowly defeated by Rockefeller in the general election. (Another candidate in the primary was former Arkansas Attorney General Bruce Bennett of El Dorado, who was first elected in 1956, the year that Johnson challenged Faubus. Bennett, at the time a segregationist, himself unsuccessfully opposed Faubus in the 1960 gubernatorial primary.)

Johnson made three more bids for office, all unsuccessful. In 1976, he unsuccessfully challenged the re-election bid of Chief Justice Carleton Harris of the Arkansas Supreme Court, but lost with 44% of the vote. In 1980, expressing alarm that Pulaski County Circuit Judge Richard Adkisson, who Johnson considered too liberal, would succeed Harris as Chief Justice, Johnson mounted a petition drive to get on the ballot as an Independent, but fell short of the required signatures. Adkisson won the Democratic primary and was unopposed in the general election. After his son, Mark, was appointed to the cabinet of Governor Frank White (a Republican), Johnson hinted he would switch parties. In 1983 he did so and ran as the GOP nominee for Chief Justice in 1984, but lost by a 58-42% margin to Jack Holt, Jr., a nephew of Frank Holt, whom Johnson had defeated for the gubernatorial nomination in 1966.

Later years
The Johnsons resided in Conway until their deaths, three years apart. Virginia was Jim Johnson's legal secretary for his entire law career. She died of cancer in 2007, and Johnson himself was stricken with the same disease. (Their old intraparty rival, Faubus, also spent his last years in Conway.)

In the 1980s, Jim and Virginia Johnson supported the re-election of Governor Frank D. White, Arkansas' second Republican governor since Reconstruction. White, however, was unseated after one two-year term by Bill Clinton, with whom Johnson had a long-standing enmity. While he had been a student at Georgetown University in Washington, D.C., Clinton was a campaign aide for Johnson's 1966 runoff opponent, Judge Frank Holt. Twelve years later, Clinton would win the governorship. In reference to Johnson's overtly racist views and dirty campaign tactics, Clinton once told Johnson, "You make me ashamed to be from Arkansas." Years later, Johnson replied that he was ashamed Arkansas had produced "a president of the United States who is a queer-mongering, whore-hopping adulterer; a baby-killing, draft-dodging, dope-tolerating, lying, two-faced, treasonous activist." He also appeared in Jerry Falwell’s The Clinton Chronicles and was a paid consultant for the Arkansas Project.

During the Whitewater controversy, Johnson made accusations against Clinton based on a continuing opposition research campaign conducted by Republican political consultants, Floyd Brown and David Bossie. A client of Johnson's, David Hale, a former municipal court judge, was the special prosecutor's chief witness attempting to link Clinton to the Whitewater scandal. Hale's testimony was deemed to have been of no import, as he had agreed to testify under plea bargaining to secure a better deal on his own indictment for fraud.

Unlike George Wallace, who repented of his segregationist past, Johnson — who sometimes refused to shake hands with black voters, was once endorsed by the Ku Klux Klan, and campaigned against "mongrelization" — never apologized. In 1996, he said: "I have to admit that I have not grown to the point where I am not uncomfortable when I see a mixed couple. It causes me discomfort. But I say in the same breath that when I see a drunk it causes me discomfort."

Death
The Faulkner County Sheriff's Office reported that Johnson was found dead about 10 a.m. on Saturday, February 13, 2010, at his home off Beaverfork Lake with a self-inflicted gunshot wound to the chest. Rice said a rifle was found, and authorities had no reason to suspect foul play. He had been suffering from cancer. The Johnsons had three sons, Mark of Little Rock, who was elected to the Arkansas State Senate in 2018, John David of Fayetteville, and Joseph Daniel of Conway.

Johnson's life story and death were remarkably similar to that of an unrepentant segregationist leader in Louisiana, William M. Rainach of Claiborne Parish, a state legislator and an unsuccessful gubernatorial candidate in his state's 1959 primary election.

References

External links
Encyclopedia of Arkansas History & Culture entry

1924 births
2010 suicides
Arkansas Democrats
Arkansas lawyers
Arkansas state senators
Justices of the Arkansas Supreme Court
People from Crossett, Arkansas
People from Conway, Arkansas
Politicians from Little Rock, Arkansas
American politicians who committed suicide
Suicides by firearm in Arkansas
Arkansas Republicans
Arkansas Independents
Bill Clinton
Lawyers from Little Rock, Arkansas
2010 deaths
American segregationists